Jack Connell may refer to:

 Jack Connell (Georgia politician) (1919–2013), American politician in the Georgia House of Representatives
 Jack W. Connell Jr. (born 1937), American politician in the Texas House of Representatives
 Jack Connell (footballer) (1912–1983), Australian rules footballer